Le Cordon Bleu of Culinary Arts in Austin (LCB-Austin) was a private school located in The Domain, a , multi-use park  in Austin, Texas.  The cooking school was affiliated with Le Cordon Bleu Schools North America.

Originally named Le Chef College of Hospitality Careers, Ronald F. Boston started the school as a chef-apprenticeship program in 1981.   In 1999, the school was renamed Texas Culinary Academy. TCA was acquired by Career Education Corporation in August 2001.

LCB-Austin operated within a  facility that contained six  labs, classrooms, a student library, a computer lab, a restaurant, a cafe and a retail store.   Also located within the facility was a 100-seat demonstration kitchen.

The school operated two on-campus restaurants.  Ventana, a 100-seat restaurant which served classical French cuisine, opened in late 2002, and The Bleu River Grille, a casual coffee and sandwich shop.

LCB-Austin offered an Associate of Applied Science Degree in Le Cordon Bleu Culinary Arts and certificates in Le Cordon Bleu Pâtisserie & Baking and Le Cordon Bleu Culinary Arts.

References

External links 
 Texas Culinary Academy

Cooking schools in the United States
Educational institutions established in 1981
1981 establishments in Texas
Universities and colleges in Austin, Texas
Career Education Corporation
Educational institutions disestablished in 2017
2017 disestablishments in Texas